Gastrotheca marsupiata is a species of frog in the family Hemiphractidae. It is found in the Amazonian drainage systems of Andes from central Peru to southern Bolivia. Its common names are marsupian frog, common marsupial frog, and for now synonymized Leptodactylus/Eleutherodactylus andicola, Boettger's robber frog. It is a locally common frog present in primary, secondary and disturbed cloud and montane forests in the valleys of the central Andes.

References

marsupiata
Amphibians of the Andes
Amphibians of Bolivia
Amphibians of Peru
Taxonomy articles created by Polbot
Amphibians described in 1841
Taxa named by André Marie Constant Duméril
Taxa named by Gabriel Bibron